The 2015 Southland Conference baseball tournament was held from May 20 through 23. The top eight regular season finishers of the league's ten teams met in the double-elimination tournament held at Constellation Field in Sugar Land, Texas. The event returned to Sugar Land as part of a two season contract after one season on campus.

Seeding and format
The top eight finishers from the regular season, not including Abilene Christian or Incarnate Word, were seeded one through eight.  Seeding for the 2015 tournament was based on the order of finish in conference regular season play.  No tie-breakers were needed, and teams ineligible for the 2015 tournament did not finish in the top eight.  The teams played a two bracket, double–elimination tournament, with the winner of each bracket meeting in a single championship final.

Results

Line scores

Day one

Game 1 (Central Arkansas vs Nicholls)

Game 2 (Houston Baptist vs Northwestern State)

Game 3 (Texas A&M–Corpus Christi vs Southeastern Louisiana)

Game 4 (Sam Houston State vs McNeese State)

Day two

Game 5 (Northwestern State vs Nicholls)

Game 6 (McNeese State vs Southeastern Louisiana)

Game 7 (Central Arkansas vs Houston Baptist)

Game 8 (Texas A&M–Corpus Christi vs Sam Houston State)

Day three

Game 9 (Northwestern State vs Central Arkansas)

Game 10 (Southeastern Louisiana vs Texas A&M–Corpus Christi)

Game 11 (Houston Baptist vs Central Arkansas)

Game 12 (Sam Houston State vs Texas A&M–Corpus Christi)

Day four

Game "14" (Texas A&M–Corpus Christi vs Sam Houston State)

Championship game (Houston Baptist vs Sam Houston State)

Awards and honors
Source:  

Tournament MVP: Curtis Jones – Houston Baptist

All–Tournament Teams:

 Greg Espiosna – Houston Baptist
 Andrew Alvarez – Houston Baptist
 Clay Thomas – Houston Baptist
 Jake MacWillians – Sam Houston State
 Hayden Simerly – Sam Houston State
 Bryce Johnson – Sam Houston State
 Andrew Godail – Sam Houston State
 Zacarias Hardy – Texas A&M–Corpus Christi
 Brett Burner – Texas A&M–Corpus Christi
 Ty Tice – Central Arkansas
 Carson Crites – Southeastern Louisiana

See also
2015 Southland Conference softball tournament

References

Tournament
Southland Conference Baseball Tournament
Baseball in Texas
Southland Conference Baseball
Southland Conference baseball tournament